Atlamajalcingo del Monte  is one of the 81 municipalities of Guerrero, in south-western Mexico. The municipal seat lies at Atlamajalcingo del Monte.  The municipality covers an area of 199.4 km².

As of 2005, the municipality had a total population of 5,143.

References

Municipalities of Guerrero